The following is a list of properties owned by Brookfield Properties, a North American commercial real estate company. Their portfolio includes a number of shopping malls in the United States that were owned by GGP Inc. (General Growth Properties) before it was acquired by Brookfield in 2018.

United States

Alabama
 Riverchase Galleria

Arizona
 Park Place
 Tucson Mall

Arkansas
 The Mall at Turtle Creek
 Pinnacle Hills Promenade

California
 Bayshore Mall
 Chula Vista Center
 Fig Garden Village
 Galleria at Tyler
 Glendale Galleria
 Mt. Shasta Mall
 NewPark Mall
 Northridge Fashion Center
 One Union Square
 Otay Ranch Town Center
 Promenade Temecula
 The Shoppes at Carlsbad
 Southland Mall
 Stonestown Galleria
 Valley Plaza
 Visalia Mall
 West Valley Mall

Colorado
 Southwest Plaza
 Park Meadows

Connecticut
 Brass Mill Center
 The Shoppes at Somerset Square
 The SoNo Collection

Delaware
 Christiana Mall

Florida
 Altamonte Mall
 Bayside Marketplace
 Coastland Center
 Governor's Square
 Lakeland Square Mall
 Miami Design District
 Mizner Park
 The Oaks Mall
 Pembroke Lakes Mall
 Shops at Merrick Park

Georgia
 Augusta Mall
 Cumberland Mall
 North Point Mall
 Oglethorpe Mall
 Peachtree Mall
 Perimeter Mall
 The Shoppes at River Crossing

Hawaii
 Ala Moana Center
 Prince Kuhio Plaza
 Whalers Village

Idaho
 Boise Towne Square
 Grand Teton Mall
 Silver Lake Mall

Illinois
 Market Place Shopping Center
 Northbrook Court
 Oakbrook Center
 605 N Michigan Avenue
 830 N Michigan Avenue

Indiana
 Glenbrook Square

Iowa
 Coral Ridge Mall
 Jordan Creek Town Center

Kentucky
 Greenwood Mall
 Mall St. Matthews
 Oxmoor Center

Louisiana
 Mall of Louisiana
 Nord du Lac
 Oakwood Center
 Pecanland Mall
 Pierre Bossier Mall

Maine
 The Maine Mall

Maryland
 The Centre at Salisbury
 The Gallery
 The Mall in Columbia
 Mondawmin Mall
 Towson Town Center

Massachusetts
 Natick Mall

Michigan
 Birchwood Mall
 The Crossroads
 Grand Traverse Mall
 RiverTown Crossings
 Southland Center
 Westwood Mall

Minnesota
 Apache Mall
 Crossroads Center
 Ridgedale Center

Mississippi
 The Mall at Barnes Crossing

Nebraska
 Westroads Mall

Nevada
 Fashion Show
 Grand Canal Shoppes
 Meadows Mall
 Galleria at Sunset

New Jersey
 Paramus Park
 Willowbrook

New Mexico
 Animas Valley Mall
 Coronado Center

New York
 Crown Building
 Staten Island Mall
 85 Fifth Avenue
 200 Lafayette Street
 218 W. 57th Street
 530 Fifth Avenue
 685 Fifth Avenue

North Carolina
 Carolina Place
 Four Seasons Town Centre
 Greenville Mall
 Independence Mall
 The Streets at Southpoint
 Valley Hills Mall

Ohio
 Beachwood Place
 Kenwood Towne Centre

Oklahoma
 Quail Springs Mall
 Sooner Mall

Oregon
 Clackamas Town Center
 Pioneer Place

Pennsylvania
 Neshaminy Mall
 Park City Center

Rhode Island
 Providence Place

South Carolina
 Columbiana Centre

Texas
 Baybrook Mall
 Deerbrook Mall
 First Colony Mall
 Hulen Mall
 North Star Mall
 The Parks Mall at Arlington
 The Shops at La Cantera
 Sikes Senter
 Stonebriar Centre
 Town East Mall
 Willowbrook Mall
 The Woodlands Mall

Utah
 Fashion Place

Vermont
 CityPlace Burlington
 Maple Tree Place

Virginia
 Chesterfield Towne Center
 Lynnhaven Mall
 Tysons Galleria

Washington
 Alderwood
 Bellis Fair
 NorthTown Mall
 The Shops at the Bravern
 Spokane Valley Mall
 Westlake Center

Wisconsin
 Fox River Mall
 Mayfair
 Oakwood Mall

Wyoming
 White Mountain Mall

References

Brookfield Properties